A National Depository Centre is a public library in India which receives a copy of all books, newspapers and periodicals published in the country with ISBN and ISSN as the case may be. There are four centres:

Connemara Public Library in Chennai
Asiatic Society of Bombay in Mumbai
National Library, Calcutta
Delhi Public Library, Delhi

References

External links
 The delivery of Books (Public Libraries) Act, 1954
 Delivery of Books (Public Libraries) Rules, 1955
Public Records Act, 1993
Public Records Rules, 1993
Libraries in India